Aslan Taimurazovich Zaseev (born 7 March 1982) is a former Russian football player.

Club career
He made his debut in the Russian Premier League in 2007 with FC Kuban Krasnodar.

External links
 
  Profile on the FC Kuban Krasnodar site

1982 births
Living people
Russian footballers
FC Lada-Tolyatti players
FC Chernomorets Novorossiysk players
FC Kuban Krasnodar players
Russian Premier League players
FC Volga Nizhny Novgorod players
FC Luch Vladivostok players
PFC Spartak Nalchik players
Association football defenders
FC Tambov players
FC Neftekhimik Nizhnekamsk players